Lan Bastian (born April 1, 1985) is an Indonesian footballer who currently plays for Gresik United in the Indonesia Super League.

References

External links

1985 births
Association football defenders
Living people
Indonesian footballers
Liga 1 (Indonesia) players
Gresik United players
Indonesian Premier Division players
Persekabpas Pasuruan players
21st-century Indonesian people